Never Enough is the debut album by former Scandal singer Patty Smyth.  It was released in 1987 on Columbia Records (also the group's label) three years after the band's breakup in 1984.

Content
On The Bloomberg Report, Smyth said the album "was never supposed to be a solo record; it was meant to be a record by Scandal Featuring Patty Smyth. Even though the band had broken up, I was still with Keith Mack; it was Zack and I that had ended our partnership."

Though she would later have success as a songwriter, Smyth cowrote only the album's first and last tracks. The first – the title track – was a slight rewrite of a song of the same title from the self-titled debut album of then-current (in 1987) Hooters bandmembers Rob Hyman and Eric Bazilian's former band, Baby Grand. The original version featured different lyrics sung by Baby Grand frontman David Kagan. Hyman and Bazilian, as well as others associated with The Hooters, including producer Rick Chertoff, had a significant hand in the making of this album.

The album includes three cover versions. "Downtown Train", by Tom Waits, was covered that same year by country singer-songwriter Mary Chapin Carpenter for her album Hometown Girl and later in 1989 by Rod Stewart and included on his 1991 album "Vagabond Heart". "Call To Heaven" was originally "Les Morts Dansant", from British hard rock band Magnum's 1985 album On a Storyteller's Night. "Isn't it Enough" was from Danny Wilde's 1986 release "The Boyfriend".

The LP peaked at 66 in the U.S. and spawned three singles: the title track (#61 pop, #4 U.S. Mainstream Rock Tracks), "Downtown Train" (#95 pop, #40 Mainstream) and "Isn't It Enough" (failed to chart on pop, #26 Mainstream).

The album was produced by William Wittman and Rick Chertoff. Chertoff was one of the people on the production team of Cyndi Lauper's She's So Unusual, and would work with platinum-selling singer-songwriter Joan Osborne on her 1995 album, Relish.

Musician reviewer J. D. Considine wrote simply: "In case you ever wondered what Eddie Money would have been like as a girl."

Track listing 
 "Never Enough" (Rob Hyman, Eric Bazilian, Rick Chertoff, Patty Smyth, David Kagan) - 4:15
 "Downtown Train" (Tom Waits) - 5:05
 "Give It Time" (Rob Hyman, David Kagan) - 4:17
 "Call to Heaven" (Tony Clarkin) - 5:06
 "The River Cried" (Billy Steinberg, Tom Kelly) - 4:16
 "Isn't It Enough" (Danny Wilde, Nick Trevisick) - 4:22
 "Sue Lee" (Willie Nile, Rick Chertoff) - 3:48
 "Tough Love" (Nick Gilder, Duane Hitchings) - 4:54
 "Heartache Heard 'Round the World" (Rob Hyman, Eric Bazilian, Rick Chertoff, Patty Smyth) - 4:54

Production 
 Rick Chertoff – producer 
 William Wittman – producer 
 John Agnello – engineer, mixing 
 George Marino – mastering 
 Norman Moore – art direction, design 
 Gary Heery – photography 
 Mark Spector Company, Inc. – management

Personnel 
 Patty Smyth – lead vocals
 Eric Bazilian – keyboards, guitars, backing vocals 
 Rob Hyman – keyboards, backing vocals 
 Ralph Schuckett – keyboards 
 Richard Termini – keyboards 
 Peter Wood – keyboards
 Rick DiFonzo – guitars 
 Keith Mack – guitars 
 William Wittman – guitars, backing vocals 
 Tommy Conwell – guitar solo (6)
 Neil Jason – bass
 Anton Fig – drums, percussion
 Ray Spiegel – tabla
 David Sanborn – saxophone solo (2)
 Magic Dick – harmonica solo (3)
 John Agnello – backing vocals
 Ellison Chase – backing vocals
 Rory Dodd – backing vocals
 Andy King – backing vocals
 John Loeffler – backing vocals
 Kasim Sulton – backing vocals
 Eric Troyer – backing vocals

References 

 Patty Smyth: Never Enough liner notes. 1987, Columbia Records.

External links 
 [ "Never Enough" at allmusic]
 "Never Enough" at discogs
 Patty Smyth talks briefly about "Never Enough"

1987 debut albums
Columbia Records albums
Patty Smyth albums
Albums produced by Rick Chertoff